Espen Hammer (born 17 March 1966) is a Norwegian philosopher. He is a professor of philosophy at Temple University and has held visiting professorships at the New School for Social Research and the University of Pennsylvania. Between 1998 and 2007 he was a Lecturer and later Reader at the University of Essex. He has also been a professor of philosophy at the University of Oslo. He currently lives in Philadelphia.

Hammer's main focus is on the post-Kantian European tradition of philosophy. Most of his work deals with questions of ethics, politics and subjectivity. This includes work on German philosopher Theodor W. Adorno. He has also written Det indre mørke, about the history of the concept of melancholia.

Selected bibliography
 Philosophy and Temporality from Kant to Critical Theory Cambridge University Press 2011 
 Adorno and the Political (Thinking the Political) Routledge 2005 
 Adorno's Modernism: Art, Experience, and Catastrophe Cambridge University Press 2015
 Inner Darkness: An Essay on Melancholy Universitetsforlaget 2004
 Stanley Cavell: Skepticism, Subjectivity, and the Ordinary Polity Press 2002 
 Editor of German Idealism: Contemporary Perspectives Routledge 2007
 Editor of Stanley Cavell: Die Unheimlichkeit des Gewohnlichen Fischer Verlag 2002
 Editor of Kafka's The Trial: Philosophical Perspectives Oxford University Press 2018
 Co-Editor (with Peter E Gordon and Axel Honneth) of The Routledge Companion to the Frankfurt School Routledge 2019
 Co-editor (with Peter E Gordon and Max Pensky) of A Companion to Adorno Wiley-Blackwell 2020

References

1966 births
Living people
Academic staff of the University of Oslo
Norwegian philosophers
Temple University faculty